Terence or Terry Young may refer to:

Terence Young (director) (1915–1994), British film director
Terence Young (politician) (born 1952), Canadian Conservative Party politician
Terence Young (writer), Canadian writer
Terry Young (American politician) (born 1948), former mayor of Tulsa, Oklahoma
Terry Young (Australian politician) (born 1968), Liberal MP for Longman
Terry Young (table tennis) (born 1978), table tennis player from England

See also
Young (surname)